The 1941 Lower Hutt mayoral election was part of the New Zealand local elections held that same year. The elections were held for the role of Mayor of Lower Hutt plus other local government positions including the nine city councillors, also elected triennially. The polling was conducted using the standard first-past-the-post electoral method.

Background
The incumbent Mayor, Jack Andrews, sought re-election for a fourth term. Andrews was opposed by Labour Party candidate Henry Valentine Horlor who had been a councillor since 1938. The election occurred in the shadow of the infamous 'Nathan Incident', a political scandal that developed in nearby Wellington revolving around Hubert Nathan, a Citizens' Association candidate for the Wellington Harbour Board who was critical of the number of union secretaries on the Labour ticket for the 1941 civic elections. Nathan alleged that 5 unionists used "Gestapo tactics" to try and blackmail him into withdrawing his nomination and accusing them of Antisemitism. The press ran articles on the alleged confrontation (which was refuted by Labour) and as a result Labour candidates struggled in the election with a decisive Citizens' victory.

Mayoral results

Councillor results

Notes

References

Mayoral elections in Lower Hutt
1941 elections in New Zealand
Politics of the Wellington Region